Phenylethanol may refer to:

 1-Phenylethanol
 2-Phenylethanol (phenethyl alcohol)